The following outline is provided as an overview of and topical guide to Djibouti:

Djibouti – country located in the Horn of Africa. It is bordered by Eritrea in the north, Ethiopia in the west and south, and Somalia in the southeast. The remainder of the border is formed by the Red Sea and the Gulf of Aden at the east. Djibouti occupies a total area of just . In antiquity, the territory was part of the Land of Punt. Djibouti is a multi-ethnic nation, with a population of over 790,000 inhabitants. The Somali and Afar make up the two largest ethnic groups. Both speak Afro-Asiatic languages, which serve as recognized national languages. Arabic and French constitute the country's two official languages. About 94% of residents adhere to Islam, a religion that has been predominant in the region for more than 1,000 years. Djibouti is strategically located near the world's busiest shipping lanes, controlling access to the Red Sea and Indian Ocean.

General reference

 Pronunciation: 
 Common English country name: Djibouti
 Official English country name: The Republic of Djibouti
 Common endonym(s):  
 Official endonym(s):  
 Adjectival(s): Djiboutian
 Demonym(s):
 ISO country codes: DJ, DJI, 262
 ISO region codes: See ISO 3166-2:DJ
 Internet country code top-level domain: .dj

Geography of Djibouti 

Geography of Djibouti
 Djibouti is: a country
 Location:
 Eastern Hemisphere and Southern Hemisphere
 Africa
 North Africa
 East Africa
 Horn of Africa
 Time zone:  East Africa Time (UTC+03)
 Extreme points of Djibouti
 High:  Mousa Ali 
 Low:  Lake Asal  – lowest point outside of Asia
 Land boundaries:  516 km
 349 km
 109 km
 58 km
 Coastline:  314 km
 Population of Djibouti: 833,000  - 156th most populous country

 Area of Djibouti: 23,200 km2
 Atlas of Djibouti

Environment of Djibouti 

 Climate of Djibouti
 Geology of Djibouti
 Wildlife of Djibouti
 Fauna of Djibouti
 Birds of Djibouti
 Mammals of Djibouti

Natural geographic features of Djibouti 

 Glaciers in Djibouti: none 
 Islands of Djibouti
 Mountains of Djibouti
 Volcanoes in Djibouti
 Rivers of Djibouti
 World Heritage Sites in Djibouti: None

Regions of Djibouti 

Regions of Djibouti

Ecoregions of Djibouti

Administrative divisions of Djibouti 
 See: Administrative divisions of Djibouti

 Regions of Djibouti
 Districts of Djibouti

Regions of Djibouti 

Regions of Djibouti

Districts of Djibouti 

Districts of Djibouti

Municipalities of Djibouti 

 Capital of Djibouti: Djibouti City
 Cities of Djibouti

Demography of Djibouti 

Demographics of Djibouti

Government and politics of Djibouti 

 Politics of Djibouti
 Form of government: unitary presidential representative democratic republic
 Capital of Djibouti: Djibouti City
 Elections in Djibouti
 Political parties in Djibouti

Branches of the government of Djibouti 

 Politics of Djibouti

Executive branch of the government of Djibouti 
 Head of state and head of government: President of Djibouti, Ismaïl Omar Guelleh
 Cabinet of Djibouti
 Prime Minister of Djibouti, Abdoulkader Kamil Mohamed
 Ministries of Djibouti

Legislative branch of the government of Djibouti 

 National Assembly of Djibouti (unicameral)

Judicial branch of the government of Djibouti 

 Court system of Djibouti

Foreign relations of Djibouti 

Foreign relations of Djibouti
 Diplomatic missions in Djibouti
 Diplomatic missions of Djibouti

International organization membership 
The Republic of Djibouti is a member of:

African, Caribbean, and Pacific Group of States (ACP)
African Development Bank Group (AfDB)
African Union (AU)
Arab Fund for Economic and Social Development (AFESD)
Arab Monetary Fund (AMF)
Common Market for Eastern and Southern Africa (COMESA)
Food and Agriculture Organization (FAO)
Group of 77 (G77)
Inter-Governmental Authority on Development (IGAD)
International Bank for Reconstruction and Development (IBRD)
International Civil Aviation Organization (ICAO)
International Criminal Court (ICCt)
International Criminal Police Organization (Interpol)
International Development Association (IDA)
International Federation of Red Cross and Red Crescent Societies (IFRCS)
International Finance Corporation (IFC)
International Fund for Agricultural Development (IFAD)
International Labour Organization (ILO)
International Maritime Organization (IMO)
International Monetary Fund (IMF)
International Olympic Committee (IOC)
International Red Cross and Red Crescent Movement (ICRM)

International Telecommunication Union (ITU)
International Trade Union Confederation (ITUC)
Islamic Development Bank (IDB)
League of Arab States (LAS)
Multilateral Investment Guarantee Agency (MIGA)
Nonaligned Movement (NAM)
Organisation internationale de la Francophonie (OIF)
Organisation of Islamic Cooperation (OIC)
Organisation for the Prohibition of Chemical Weapons (OPCW)
United Nations (UN)
United Nations Conference on Trade and Development (UNCTAD)
United Nations Educational, Scientific, and Cultural Organization (UNESCO)
United Nations Industrial Development Organization (UNIDO)
United Nations Mission for the Referendum in Western Sahara (MINURSO)
Universal Postal Union (UPU)
World Customs Organization (WCO)
World Federation of Trade Unions (WFTU)
World Health Organization (WHO)
World Intellectual Property Organization (WIPO)
World Meteorological Organization (WMO)
World Tourism Organization (UNWTO)
World Trade Organization (WTO)

Law and order in Djibouti 

 Law of Djibouti
 Constitution of Djibouti
 Human rights in Djibouti
 LGBT rights in Djibouti
 Law enforcement in Djibouti

Djibouti Armed Forces 

 Djibouti Armed Forces
 Command
 Commander-in-chief:
 Ministry of Defence of Djibouti
 Forces
 Djibouti National Army
 Djibouti Air Force
 Djiboutian Navy
 Military history of Djibouti

Local government in Djibouti 

 Local government in Djibouti

History of Djibouti 

History of Djibouti
Current events of Djibouti
 Military history of Djibouti

Culture of Djibouti 

Culture of Djibouti
 Cuisine of Djibouti
 Languages of Djibouti
 National symbols of Djibouti
 Coat of arms of Djibouti
 Flag of Djibouti
 National anthem of Djibouti
 People of Djibouti
 Public holidays in Djibouti
 Religion in Djibouti
 Christianity in Djibouti
 Islam in Djibouti
 Sikhism in Djibouti
 World Heritage Sites in Djibouti: None
 Proposed: Lake Assal zone, including Ardoukoba volcano

Art in Djibouti 
 Art in Djibouti
 Cinema of Djibouti
 Literature of Djibouti
 Music of Djibouti

Sports in Djibouti 

Sports in Djibouti
 Football in Djibouti
 Djibouti at the Olympics

Economy and infrastructure of Djibouti 

Economy of Djibouti
 Economic rank, by nominal GDP (2007): 170th (one hundred and seventieth)
 Agriculture in Djibouti
 Communications in Djibouti
 Telecommunications in Djibouti (includes Internet)
 Companies of Djibouti
Currency of Djibouti: Franc
ISO 4217: DJF
 Energy in Djibouti
 Health care in Djibouti
 Mining in Djibouti
 Tourism in Djibouti
 Transport in Djibouti
 Airports in Djibouti
 Rail transport in Djibouti

Education in Djibouti 

Education in Djibouti

Health in Djibouti 

Health in Djibouti

See also 

Djibouti

Index of Djibouti-related articles
List of international rankings
Member state of the United Nations
Outline of Africa

References

External links

 Government
 Official Website
allAfrica news headline links
Daily press review in French and English
Interview with U.S. Ambassador to Djibouti - Stuart Symington (The Yale Politic)

 Overviews
BBC News - Country Profile: Djibouti
CIA World Factbook - Djibouti
Indian Ocean Newsletter - Djibouti

 Directories
Arab Gateway - Djibouti directory category
DjibNet directory, mostly in French

Stanford University - Africa South of the Sahara: Djibouti directory category
University of Pennsylvania - African Studies Center: Djibouti directory category
Yahoo! - Djibouti directory category

 Tourism

Djibouti